This is a list of large hospitals ranked by bed capacity and staffing within a single campus.

Hospital networks that consist of several campuses are not considered as a whole, and statistics from satellite campuses are not included. Campuses that do not have reliable sources may not be included; it is not necessarily a complete list.

Ranked by capacity 
This is a list of hospital campuses with a capacity of more than 1,500 beds.

Ranked by staff 
This is a list of hospital campuses with more than 10,000 staff.

See also 
Lists of hospitals
List of largest hospital networks
List of tallest hospitals
List of the oldest hospitals in the United States

Notes

References 

Capacity
Hospitals by capacity